Eqbalabad-e Sisakht (also Romanized as Eqbālābād-e Sīsakht; also known as Eqbālābād) is a village in Dana Rural District, in the Central District of Dana County, Kohgiluyeh and Boyer-Ahmad Province, Iran. At the 2006 census, its population was 89, in 20 families.

References 

Populated places in Dana County